Michael Dierks (born 21 July 1970) is a German actor from Cologne.

Biography 

His father is the record producer Dieter Dierks, who produced stars such as the Scorpions and Twisted Sister. Michael grew up at the Dierks Studios. There he entertained stars of the music and movie industry already as a child, usually when they were taking breaks from recording at the Studios. His choice to become an actor came naturally. He went to school in Stommeln and Cologne, Germany, but when he turned 18 he decided to move to America. He studied acting, directing, and entertainment business at the University of California, Los Angeles and graduated magna cum laude. His first film role came through the Warner Bros. production Mambo Kings with Antonio Banderas. However, he missed his homeland and returned to Germany to continue his career there.

Acting career 

He became a German cult figure through the hit TV show TV Kaiser, which ran for five years and re-runs are still shown on German RTL TV channel every day. In the show he played the character of "Marco Mommson" the clumsy assistant to a talk show host and dressed up as various stars in music and television, including women. He imitated Karl Lagerfeld, Tina Turner and many others. In 1997 he then was nominated by the German magazine Hörzu for the "Golden Camera" as "Best Comedic Actor of the Year". 
Appearances on the German Saturday Night Live followed and he hosted the big 24-hour BBC and RTL 2 TV marathon for New Year's Eve 2000, which started at noon and finished at noon the next day and had live cameras showing countries from the New Zealand to US at the same time.
In the year 2004 he made his German movie debut with Austrian star Christoph Waltz and German star Iris Berben in Beautiful Widows are Better Kissers, directed by Carlo Rola.

Music productions  

Dierks owns his own record label called Reform House, featuring mostly house music. He started his music career while being in America. He got together with the power team of Bionic Beat Records and soon their collaborations were playing in Germany's biggest house clubs and were featured in TV shows.
He has also released several of his own records, including self-produced remixes of Rah Band (Richard Hewson), which found a following in Europe and Japan.
He often is a guest on radio shows, playing his music and comedy.

Other information 

Michael Dierks lives in London, England for almost 10 years and became a British Citizen in 2021. He comes from a long line of entertainers and entertainment industry professionals. His father is the record producer Dieter Dierks, his youngest sister is writer/director Dominique Schilling, his grandfather was the composer Hans Dierks.
Michael Dierks is not married and does not have children, but he does a lot of charity work, mostly for children's cancer research and the SOS Children's Villages.

Filmography 
2021: Unter Uns, RTL
2020: The Postcard Killings
2017: Dedication based upon Stephen King                                                   
2013: Der letzte Bulle
2011: Als das Wasser bergauf lief (Kino)
2005: Bewegte Männer
2004: Reiche Witwen küssen besser
2004: VIVA Star Chat Moderation
2002-08: Hausmeister Krause
2002: Alles Pocher oder was?
2002: Marienhof
2002: Die Couchmanns
2001: Marienhof
2001: Anwalt Abel
2000: v.s (Kurzfilm)
2000: Live Countdown Neujahr
1995-99: TV Kaiser
1999: Deutschland blüht
1999: VIVA Stand-up TV
1998: RTL Samstag Spät Nacht
1997: Gute Zeiten, schlechte Zeiten
1994-95: Cult Moderation TV
1991: Mambo Kings
1990: Mothers Finest MV

External links 
Michael Dierks' Official Website 

1970 births
Living people
German male film actors
German male television actors
Actors from Cologne